The Independence Association (독립협회, 獨立協會) was founded through the initiative of Philip Jaisohn (Seo Jae-pil) on July 2, 1896. At its founding it was recognized by the Korean Ministry of Foreign Affairs.
Despite some remarkable achievements, by the late nineteenth century Korea found itself wholly unable to resist, or even properly comprehend the encroachments of foreign powers. Japan's victory in the First Sino-Japanese War had both removed the Chinese from the peninsula and exacted an acknowledgment of Korean independence, but the country's independence was fragile, with Japan, Russia, and other powers vying for influence. The group was founded by reform-minded citizens, and worked to strengthen Korean independence, promote national self-strengthening, create a public sphere, and advocate democratic participation in government decisions. The club published a newspaper, Tongnip Sinmun (The Independent), and worked to create symbols of Korean independence. It supported public education, journalism, and language reform. Its political program for reforming the government into a constitutional monarchy brought it into conflict with the Emperor and conservatives in the court, and the club was ordered to disband in December 1898.

Overview 
It did not go unnoticed in Korea that Emperor Gojong and his high officials were prepared to rely on the support and benevolence of foreign powers to preserve the territorial integrity of Korea. If the government could not act in the face of such an external threat however, the people could, and did. The public at large reacted by attacking the government's ineffective policies and fought dauntlessly to maintain their nation's independence and freedom. The fight was carried out largely through the efforts of a newly emerging class of intellectuals that had been exposed to the liberal ideas of Western culture.

At its roots, the Enlightenment thought of these new reformers represented a continuation of the old school traditions of Northern Learning within the Sirhak movement. It held to the same goals of achieving national prosperity and military strength through the introduction of new technology and the development of modern commerce and industry. The difference this time was the new reformers were reaching to the West for modernization, not to China.

The enlightenment thinkers pushed the notion that their goals could be best achieved by throwing open Korea's ports and establishing commercial relations with the West. Topping the list of Korea's concerns was the acquisition of Western weapons technology to improve its ability to defend itself. In addition, Korea was very interested in acquiring new agricultural technology to help enrich the country. Gradually however, this concern gave way to a more radical stream of enlightenment thought that placed a high priority on political and institutional change in the government.

The dynastic weakness and foreign aggression in both China and Korea between 1896 and 1898 led to a number of internal reform movements. In the search for new answers, Korea certainly had its own visionaries, men like Yu Kil-chun, who studied in both Japan and the United States during the 1880s and had visited Europe. Edward S. Morse, Director of the Peabody Museum in Boston, Massachusetts, had made three trips to Japan in the 1870s and 1880s and dedicated himself to bringing Asian art and culture to the United States. In 1883, Morse was asked to help organized the first official Korean delegation to America. Yu Kil-chun, a junior member of that delegation, became friends with Morse and remained in the United States to continue his education. After returning to Korea, Yu wrote the first Korean book on the West, Observations on a Journey to the West. He wrote about the geography, history, politics, economy, society, and learning of numerous Western nations. He not only described what he saw, but measured Korea against the West and advocated that Korea follow the model of Western civilization in its drive for modernization.

Yu Kil-chun

As a progressive advocate of internationalism, Yu Kil-chun believed the process of enlightenment could take only two directions in Korea. One way would slavishly imitate the methods of others without first understanding the context in which those methods had developed. The second way, the way Yu hoped would be followed, involved first perceiving the ways of the West and then adapting them to the realities of Korea, much like the path taken by Japan. Yu proceeded to develop a plan for political and economic reform in Korea based on this approach. His ultimate objective was to establish a constitutional democracy and create a free enterprise capitalist economy.

The idea of capitalism was not unheard of in Korea at the time. In 1883, a now unknown author published an article that described the formation of a corporation. The article addressed the need to form Western style business organizations and went on to describe the structure and operation of the modern corporation. Until this transition could be accomplished however, Yu felt the constitutional monarchy of Emperor Gojong was best suited for his country.

Yi Hang-no

At the other end of the reform spectrum, the Reject Heterodoxy movement ran directly counter to the enlightened thought of men like Yu Kil-chun. Yi Hang-no was perhaps the foremost proponent of this position, one conceptually based on the Neo-Confucianism of Chu Hsi. Yi Hang-no and his followers held that Neo-Confucianism was the only valid belief system and that any civilization believing any other philosophy must be kept out of Korea at all costs. He and his followers took the extreme Confucianist position that called for continued armed resistance against foreign intrusions, asserting all the while that to advocate peaceful relations would be tantamount to abandoning the moral foundations of Korean civilization.

Yi Hang-no believed his position so strongly that in 1866, following the French attacks on Kanghwa Island, he resigned his position as Royal Secretary to the King. From then on, Yi attempted not only to rouse his countrymen to battle against foreign aggression, but insisted that internal transformation of society was also needed. Only after the government acted on the advice of its policy critics, improved the state of military readiness and appointed men of moral character to government posts, would a strong stance against foreign aggression be possible.

Yi Hang-no went so far as to call for the formation of local guerrilla militias, so called "righteous armies," to fight alongside the government in its battle against the foreign enemy. He raised a great cry in opposition to Western economic aggression against Korea. He believed that trade with the West would only impoverish Korea by taking the goods it needed for its own development. He even called for a boycott of Western goods, thinking that if Koreans did not use them, trade with the West would become unnecessary.

Seo Jae-pil

Seo Jae-pil, a sincere patriot and an advocate of modernization and political democracy, emerged as one of the leading figures behind the move toward national independence and governmental reforms in Korea. Seo Jae-pil, one of the leaders of the attempted coup d'état of 1884, fled to Japan when it failed. From there, he traveled to the United States, where he married an American woman, acquired United States citizenship, and earned a medical degree from the University of Washington. Known in America as Doctor Philip Jaisohn, Seo Jae-pil returned to Korea in early 1896 and soon afterward was offered a position as consultant to the Privy Council. Preferring to have greater freedom of action, he refused the position, but agreed to serve as an adviser to the throne, a position which broadened his contacts among prominent government leaders.

Determined to help secure Korean independence and spread the desire for democracy and reform among the population by whatever means he could, Seo Jae-pil chose the press as his medium. With government financing, he introduced modern journalism to Korea on April 7, 1896, with the publication of Korea's first independent, modern bilingual newspaper, the Dongnip Sinmun (The Independent). To attract as wide a readership as possible, the first three pages were printed in pure Hangul and the last page was printed in English. The four-page newspaper started with a press run of just 300 copies three days a week, but quickly became a daily paper that covered the views of the new intelligentsia and their liberal Western ideas.

The Independent served as an effective vehicle to spread the messages of reform and patriotic nationalism, informing the public and maintaining independence from foreign encroachment. It argued impartially both for and against government policies, calling for an all-out effort to strengthen Korean autonomy and promote the public good.

The Independent awakened Koreans to the urgent needs of the day: eliminating corruption, promoting civil rights, expanding education and solidifying national sovereignty. Seo Jae-pil took every opportunity to address the Korean people on current topics and did his utmost to introduce readers to modern science and Western ideology. He demanded the Korean government give top priority to promoting civil rights and that it safeguard national sovereignty by resisting the growth of foreign influence. He worked tirelessly to educate the public on the need for modernization by calling for wide circulation of both domestic and foreign newspapers, currency for domestic transactions, the exploitation of mining resources and commerce promoting national wealth, road construction, women's education, the promotion of Hangul for mass education and the creation of an elected congress.

Foreign Perspective

The English author Isabella Bird Bishop, an ardent traveler and the first female member of the Royal Geographical Society, wrote a number of books on her travels, including Korea and Her Neighbors. In 1898, she wroteOnly those who have formed some idea of the besotted ignorance of the Korean concerning current events in his own country, and of the credulity which makes him the victim of every rumour set afloat in the capital, can appreciate the significance of this step and its probable effect in enlightening the people, and in creating a public opinion which shall sit in judgement on regal and official misdeeds. It is already fulfilling an important function in unearthing abuses and dragging them into daylight, and is creating a desire for rational education and reasonable reform, and is becoming something of a terror to evil-doers. ... The sight of newsboys passing through the streets with bundles of a newspaper in onmun [hangul] under their arms, and of men reading them in their shops, is among the novelties of 1897.

Forming the Independence Club

A number of political organizations came into being in Korea during the 1890s, each formed with the hope of securing the nation's independence and the rights of the people. Each group tackled the problem of national independence from a different direction. The most energetic of these organizations was also the first to form. On July 2, 1896, Seo Jae-pil and Yi Sang-jae, Yun Chi-ho formally inaugurated the Independence Club (Doklip-hyuphoe). Minister of War An Kyong-su served as the club's first president and Foreign Minister Yi Wan-yong served as its chairman. The principal goals of the club were to instill a desire for independence, to instill a belief in democratic principles in the hearts of Koreans, to awaken the population to the need for self-realization and modernization, and to emphasize the strengthening of their own power.

The Independence Club drew its early membership of about 30 men from other like-minded groups, from incumbent politicians and former government officials. Members came from the Chongdong Club, founded by Yun Chi-ho and Yi Sang-jae, both active in Korea's diplomatic affairs, and from the Konyang Club (a name that symbolized the end of Korea's suzerain relationship with China), founded by Yu Kil-chun and other leaders of the reforms of 1894. As criticism of the government and its policies mounted, a number of the higher level officials associated with the Independence Club thought it wise to resign their positions for political reasons. In their place came representatives of the new intelligentsia, men influenced by Western culture whose ideology developed from the Confucian reformist idea of "Eastern ways, Western machines."

One of the most noteworthy members of the Independence Club was a young man named Ahn Chang-ho. He grew into one of Korea's most illustrious national leaders, a man who devoted his entire life to the Korean independence movement. Ahn Chang-ho was recognized as a great political and educational thinker who developed a vision and philosophy for national salvation, social reform and the philosophy of character innovation.

The selection of officers and the conduct of club business was handled democratically. Matters of importance were decided by a simple majority of the members present. In time, the Independence Club expanded its network of members into the countryside. After sufficient branches had been established in provincial towns, one group in each province became the liaison group that maintained regular contact with the club's headquarters in Seoul.

Political Action

As it became more of a citizen's assembly, the Independence Club moved beyond symbolic activities and began to initiate direct social and political action programs. This modernization movement began with the goals of awakening the Korean people, opposing the country's tributary attitude towards Qing China, promoting the cause of national self-rule, and reforming government administration. The first priority was to launch a campaign of public education and the most effective tool toward this end was The Independent, the club's newspaper. One of the first projects undertaken by the paper was an attempt to establish some tangible symbol of Korean independence.

Seo Jae-pil proposed to tear down the Yeongeunmun ("Gate of Welcoming Grace") a tile-roofed gate with stone pillars and a red wooden top. Built in 1539, this was the special gate where Chinese envoys had been escorted and received in the past. In its place, a new gate, the Dongnimmun ("Independence Gate") would be erected as a symbol of Korean independence and the end of suzerainty to a foreign power. Second, he proposed that the Mohwagwan, the guest quarters where Chinese embassies had been entertained, be renovated and that an Independence Hall and Independence Park be created there. In the context of the international crisis facing Korea at the time, the proposals evoked a warm response from the people. For the first time, the word "freedom" came in vogue in Korea.

In August 1896, within days after the proposals, the "Independence Association" was founded. The citizens responded with not only support, but sizable contributions as well. Even the royal family and many of the government's highest officials contributed to the Independence Club projects. Crown Prince Yi-Chak made a financial contribution to the group as a token of his cooperation. Within three months, membership in the association swelled to nearly ten thousand. With its success thus assured, the groundbreaking and cornerstone laying ceremony was carried out in November.

The Independence Gate, modeled after the French Arc de Triomphe in Paris, was built by Chinese workers under the watchful eyes of architectural engineer Sim Ui-seok. The new gate, which used 1850 granite blocks, was completed and dedicated in 1898. The words Tongnipmun (Independence Gate) were inscribed at the top of the gate – Korean characters on the south side and Chinese characters on the north side. Sculptors carved the Korean flag into the granite face on each side of the gate, the only place where the Korean flag could be legitimately displayed during the Japanese occupation. Retaining a bit of the past, the two large pillars on the front side of the Independence Gate were taken from the old Yongunmun Gate.

The activities of the Independence Club were specifically directed toward three primary goals: national independence, wider citizen participation in the political process, and national self-strengthening. First, it directed its energy toward safeguarding Korea's independence in the face of external pressures by urging that Korea adopt a foreign policy based on independence and neutrality, one that would show no favor to any foreign power seeking to advance its parochial interests in the peninsula. Second, the Independence Club initiated a popular rights movement in Korea to create wider participation in the political process. The ideological basis of this movement demanded the full equality of all people, the rights of free speech and assembly, the right of the individual to the security of his person and property, and the doctrine of the sovereignty of the people. In its demands for the right of the governed to participate in their governing, the Independence Club had in effect launched a grassroots political movement for political democracy in Korea. Third, the Independence Club sought to promote a movement of self-strengthening by establishing schools in each village to provide a new and more modern kind of education. In their drive to expand the commercial and industrial infrastructure in Korea, the Club promoted the construction of textile and paper mills and ironworks to further Korea's commercial capacity and industry. Finally, they urged the development of a more modern national defense capability, including a navy, to ensure the security of the country.

With the future of the peninsula increasingly tied to the fortunes of Japan and Russia, the Independence Club gained strength throughout Korea, generating a force that gave some hope to a future free from foreign influence. It unleashed a strong sense of independence among the people and generated the hope for a future free of foreign domination, the first prerequisite for the formation of a modern state.

Clash with the government and disbanding the club
The Independence Club launched a movement to establish a national assembly in April 1898. In October 1898 the club held demonstrations in front of palace in response to the government's attempts to revise repressive pre-Gabo laws. Participants included yangban, students, monks, merchants, and other commoners, as well as outcastes. The club mobilized a thousand people a day, causing great public excitement, and appears to have come close to forcing Gojong to give into their demands for an appointed assembly.

In October 1898, the club announced six requirements to the Emperor Gojong. The 6 were following:

 Neither officials nor people shall depend upon foreign aid, but shall do their best to strengthen and uphold the imperial power.
 All documents pertaining to foreign loans, the hiring of foreign soldiers, the granting of concessions, etc., in fact every document drawn up between the Korean government and a foreign party or firm, shall be signed and sealed by all the Ministers of State and the President of the Privy Council.
 Important offenders shall be punished only after they have been given a public trial and ample opportunity to defend themselves.
 To his Majesty shall belong the power to appoint Ministers, but in case a majority of the Cabinet disapproves of the Emperor's nominee he shall not be appointed.
 All sources of revenue and methods of raising taxes shall be placed under the control of the Finance Department, no other department, officer or corporation being allowed to interfere therewith; and the annual estimates and balances shall be made public.
 The existing laws and regulations shall be enforced without fear or favour.

The Independence Club took “loyalty to the emperor and patriotism for the country” as its motto. The organization tried to criticize the government for corruption, while not directly insulting Emperor Gojong, distinguish him from his “wicked” officials. Gojong, however, seems to have seen the Independence Club as a threat to his power. When the club voted to recall Park Yeong-hyo from Japan to sit in the assembly, conservatives in the court struck back. Conservatives charged that the club was plotting to overthrow the Emperor, and on November 5, 1898, seventeen club members were arrested. This resulted in bloody street battles in November that brought Seoul to a state of near anarchy. The Emperor condemned the club, saying it had "ignored government orders, rudely repudiated the court, and expelled the ministers." He resented that the club members did not heed his ordinances ordering them to curb their activities, and he ordered the organization be dissolved. After continued riots, in December 1898 Gojong enforced martial law and arrested 340 leaders of the Independence Club, sent troops to break up demonstrations, and forbade popular assemblies. Several of the leaders went into exile. Gojong preferred to uphold royal authority rather than risk opening the political system to public participation. The following years saw the Emperor work to consolidate monarchical power, and discourage public opposition.

References

Further reading 
 
Oh Se-ung, Dr. Philip Jaisohn's Reform Movement, 1896–1898: A Critical Appraisal of the Independence Club, University Press of America, 1995,

External links 
 Independence Club 
 Independence Club 

History of Korea
Yun Chi-ho
Soh Jaipil
Joseon dynasty
Human rights organizations based in Korea
Anti-Chinese sentiment in Korea
Liberal parties in Asia
Defunct liberal political parties
Organizations established in 1896